Paulo Roberto da Silva (born 26 March 1987), known as Paulo Roberto, is a Brazilian footballer who plays as a midfielder for Paysandu.

Club career
Born in Lavras, Minas Gerais, Paulo Roberto made his senior debuts with Juventus in 2007, aged 20. In 2009, after a short stint at Brasil de Farroupilha, he joined Grêmio Osasco Audax.

In April 2010, Paulo Roberto was loaned to Série A club Guarani, until December. He made his debut in the category on 9 May, starting in a 1–0 home win against Goiás.

On 15 September 2010 Paulo Roberto scored his first goal in the main category of Brazilian football, netting his team's second in a 2–4 away loss against Cruzeiro. He finished the season with 34 appearances and two goals, as his side suffered relegation.

In May 2011 Paulo Roberto moved to Atlético Paranaense, also on loan. After appearing in only one match he returned to Audax, winning promotion from Campeonato Paulista Série A2.

On 28 April 2013 Paulo Roberto joined Ponte Preta in a permanent deal. On 27 September, after failing to impress at Macaca, he was loaned to Figueirense.

In December 2013, after Figueira's promotion to the top level, Paulo Ricardo signed permanently for the club.

Honours
Figueirense
Campeonato Catarinense: 2014, 2015

Corinthians
Campeonato Brasileiro Série A: 2017
Campeonato Paulista: 2017, 2018

Fortaleza
Campeonato Cearense: 2019
Copa do Nordeste: 2019

References

External links
Paulo Roberto at playmakerstats.com (English version of ogol.com.br)

1987 births
Living people
People from Lavras
Brazilian footballers
Association football midfielders
Campeonato Brasileiro Série A players
Campeonato Brasileiro Série B players
Campeonato Brasileiro Série C players
Clube Atlético Juventus players
Grêmio Esportivo Brasil players
Grêmio Osasco Audax Esporte Clube players
Guarani FC players
Club Athletico Paranaense players
Associação Atlética Ponte Preta players
Figueirense FC players
Sport Club Corinthians Paulista players
Fortaleza Esporte Clube players
Mirassol Futebol Clube players
Esporte Clube Santo André players
Paysandu Sport Club players
Sportspeople from Minas Gerais